Balkan Dream Properties  was an international real estate company with offices in London, Moscow, Sofia and Svilengrad, as well as in Bulgaria’s resorts Sunny Beach, Golden Sands, Bansko, Pamporovo, and Varna. The company operates one of the largest real estate networks in Bulgaria. Its logo is a Bulgarian folklore detail; its slogan is "The detail makes the difference.”

Recognition
In September 2007, at a gala in London’s  Grosvenor Square Marriott Hotel, Balkan Dream Properties was recognized as the Best real estate agency Website for Bulgaria at the International Property Awards. The company also won the Best real estate agency and the Best real estate agency Website awards in 2006.

References

External links
Official Website
Property Management
Costa Rica Real Estate
Costa Rica Velez Realty

Property companies of the United Kingdom
Real estate companies of Bulgaria
Defunct companies based in London